= Athletics at the 1957 Arab Games =

Athletics at the 1957 Pan Arab Games

1957 Pan Arab Games

- Lebanon, Beirut
- October 13–27

== MEN ==
=== 100m ===
MEDAL	ATHLETE	DOB	COUNTRY	MARK	W/I	RECORD	NOTES
	Miskal Abou Kalal		IRQ	10.9		CR	
	Ghazi Ketmetto		LBN	11.1			
	Basil Jazmi		IRQ	11.3			

=== 200m ===
MEDAL	ATHLETE	DOB	COUNTRY	MARK	W/I	RECORD	NOTES
	Ghazi Ketmetto		LBN	22.4		CR	
	Daniel Farex		LBN	23.7			
	Mongi Zarrouki Soussi	1936	TUN	23.8			

=== 400m ===
MEDAL	ATHLETE	DOB	COUNTRY	MARK	W/I	RECORD	NOTES
	Mohammed Mahdi		IRQ	51.0			
	Abdo Amin		LBN	53.0			
	Saleh Nasser		LBN	54.6			

=== 800m ===
MEDAL	ATHLETE	DOB	COUNTRY	MARK	W/I	RECORD	NOTES
	Ahmed Lazreg	1934	MAR	2:00.8			
	Moustafa Meftah		MAR	2:01.6			
	Hassan Omar		TUN	2:03.3			

=== 1500m ===
MEDAL	ATHLETE	DOB	COUNTRY	MARK	W/I	RECORD	NOTES
	Ahmed Lazreg	1934	MAR	4:00.4		CR	
	Kasim Moukhtar	1927	IRQ	4:01.7			
	Said Al-Hassan		MAR	4:04.6			

=== 5000m ===
MEDAL	ATHLETE	DOB	COUNTRY	MARK	W/I	RECORD	NOTES
	Said Gerouani Benmoha	1934	MAR	14:38.6		CR	
	Bakir Benaissa	1931	MAR	14:58.5			
	Mohamed Obeidi		TUN	15:10.2			

=== 10,000m ===
MEDAL	ATHLETE	DOB	COUNTRY	MARK	W/I	RECORD	NOTES
	Bakir Benaissa	1931	MAR	32:51.1		CR	
	Mohamed Obeidi		TUN	32:56.4			
	Hassan Lafta I		IRQ	33:04.1			

=== Marathon ===
MEDAL	ATHLETE	DOB	COUNTRY	MARK	W/I	RECORD	NOTES
	Aziz Ben Omar		TUN	2:54:23			
	Ali Hajj Mousa		LBN	3:02:21			
	Said Mouini		MAR	3:10:31			

=== 110H ===
MEDAL	ATHLETE	DOB	COUNTRY	MARK	W/I	RECORD	NOTES
	Mongi Zarrouki Soussi	1936	TUN	16.5			
	Rameh Kheireddine		LBN	17.0			
	Afif Boutros		LBN	17.8			

=== 400H ===
MEDAL	ATHLETE	DOB	COUNTRY	MARK	W/I	RECORD	NOTES
	Rehaiem Assi		IRQ	57.0			
	Raheem Anbar		IRQ	59.0			
	Mongi Zarrouki Soussi	1936	TUN	59.1			

=== HJ ===
MEDAL	ATHLETE	DOB	COUNTRY	MARK	W/I	RECORD	NOTES
	Nayef Kassab		IRQ	1.80			
	Mohamed Jinyani		LBN	1.75			
	Deeb Abu Al-Hassan		EGY	1.75			

=== PV ===
MEDAL	ATHLETE	DOB	COUNTRY	MARK	W/I	RECORD	NOTES
	Farid Hanna		SYR	3.75		CR	
	Ismail Abu Karoum		LBN	3.75			
	Salim Al Bekr		KUW	3.52			

=== LJ ===
MEDAL	ATHLETE	DOB	COUNTRY	MARK	W/I	RECORD	NOTES
	Abdel Aziz Alame		LBN	6.55			
	Abdul Sattar Al-Razzak	1932	IRQ	6.54			
	Falih Fahmi	1940	IRQ	6.46			

=== TJ ===
MEDAL	ATHLETE	DOB	COUNTRY	MARK	W/I	RECORD	NOTES
	Abdul Sattar Al-Razzak	1932	IRQ	14.62		CR	
	Abdel Aziz Alame		LBN	13.84			
	Ibrahim Abou Al-Hayr		TUN	13.44			

=== SP ===
MEDAL	ATHLETE	DOB	COUNTRY	MARK	W/I	RECORD	NOTES
	Salem Jisr	1932	LBN	13.45		CR	
	Ahmed Rateeb Zulf		SYR	13.37			
	Afif Boutros		LBN	12.78			

=== DT ===
MEDAL	ATHLETE	DOB	COUNTRY	MARK	W/I	RECORD	NOTES
	Afif Boutros		LBN	40.70		CR	
	Kanaan Avni		IRQ	38.96			
	Abdullah Abdulaziz		IRQ	37.18			

=== HT ===
MEDAL	ATHLETE	DOB	COUNTRY	MARK	W/I	RECORD	NOTES
	Michel Skaff		LBN	39.55		CR	
	Fouad Esbir		LBN	34.55			
	Kanaan Avni		IRQ	31.12			

=== JT ===
MEDAL	ATHLETE	DOB	COUNTRY	MARK	W/I	RECORD	NOTES
	Mohammed Jamal Moussa		JOR	50.44			
	Sami Ibrahim Ali		LBN	45.96			
	Elie Mahoul		LBN	45.54			

=== Decathlon ===
MEDAL	ATHLETE	DOB	COUNTRY	MARK	W/I	RECORD	NOTES
	Afif Boutros		LBN	4389			
	Jamal Amin		IRQ	4356			
	Elie Mahoul		LBN	3745			

=== 4x100m ===
MEDAL	ATHLETE	DOB	COUNTRY	MARK	W/I	RECORD	NOTES
	Farkas Balyan		LBN	44.5			
	Alex Zaharia		LBN	44.5			
	Abdel Aziz Alame		LBN	44.5			
	Ghazi Ketmetto		LBN	44.5			
	Miskal Abou Kalal		IRQ	44.9			
	Hudayr Zalata	1938	IRQ	44.9			
	Jasim Kareem	1938	IRQ	44.9			
	Basil Jazmi		IRQ	44.9			
	Kader Al-Masri		SYR	44.9			
	Abdulhamid Al-Krabulsi		SYR	44.9			
	Suleiman Al-Saqqa		SYR	44.9			
	Jumaa Al-Qaisi		SYR	44.9			

=== 4x400m ===
MEDAL	ATHLETE	DOB	COUNTRY	MARK	W/I	RECORD	NOTES
	Said Al-Hassan		MAR	3:32.3			
	Moustafa Meftah		MAR	3:32.3			
	Ahmed Kaddour		MAR	3:32.3			
	Ahmed Lazreg	1934	MAR	3:32.3			
	Abdo Amin		LBN				
	Samir Jahshan		LBN				
	Michel Taweel		LBN				
	Ghazi Ketmetto		LBN				
	Hassan Omar		TUN	3:37.5			
	Abdesselam Ben Faraj		TUN	3:37.5			
	Muammer Wardli		TUN	3:37.5			
	Mongi Zarrouki Soussi	1936	TUN	3:37.5			
